Omar Ontiveros (born May 15, 1995) is an American soccer player who most recently played for LA Galaxy II of the USL Championship.

Career 
Ontiveros joined the under-20 side of Liga MX club Santos Laguna in November 2014, before heading to Luxembourg to play for side CS Grevenmacher.

Ontiveros signed with United Soccer League side Rio Grande Valley FC Toros on May 5, 2017.

On March 8, 2019, he signed with the LA Galaxy II.

Controversy
On September 25, 2020, Ontiveros was initially suspended by the USL Championship for seven games after using a racial slur and receiving a red card in a league game against San Diego Loyal, he was eventually removed from the team.

References

External links

1995 births
Living people
American soccer players
Association football defenders
CS Grevenmacher players
LA Galaxy II players
People from Pharr, Texas
Rio Grande Valley FC Toros players
Soccer players from Texas
USL Championship players
American expatriate soccer players
American expatriate sportspeople in Luxembourg
Expatriate footballers in Luxembourg